Allorhizocola rhizosphaerae is a species of bacteria from the family Micromonosporaceae which has been isolated from rhizospheric soil from the plant Calligonum mongolicum from the Xinjiang Province.

References 

Micromonosporaceae
Bacteria genera
Monotypic bacteria genera